In the mathematical subfield of numerical analysis de Boor's algorithm is a polynomial-time and numerically stable algorithm for evaluating spline curves in B-spline form. It is a generalization of de Casteljau's algorithm for Bézier curves. The algorithm was devised by Carl R. de Boor.  Simplified, potentially faster variants of the de Boor algorithm have been created but they suffer from comparatively lower stability.

Introduction 

A general introduction to B-splines is given in the main article. Here we discuss de Boor's algorithm, an efficient and numerically stable scheme to evaluate a spline curve  at position . The curve is built from a sum of B-spline functions  multiplied with potentially vector-valued constants , called control points,

B-splines of order  are connected piece-wise polynomial functions of degree  defined over a grid of knots  (we always use zero-based indices in the following). De Boor's algorithm uses O(p2) + O(p) operations to evaluate the spline curve.

Local support 

B-splines have local support, meaning that the polynomials are positive only in a finite domain and zero elsewhere. The Cox-de Boor recursion formula shows this:

Let the index  define the knot interval that contains the position, . Thus, the sum is reduced to:

It follows from  that . Similarly, we see in the recursion that the highest queried knot location is at index . This means that any knot interval  which is actually used must have at least  additional knots before and after. In a computer program, this is typically achieved by repeating the first and last used knot location  times.

The algorithm 

With these definitions, we can now describe de Boor's algorithm. The algorithm does not compute the B-spline functions  directly. Instead it evaluates  through an equivalent recursion formula.

For  the following recursion is applied:

Once the iterations are complete, we have , meaning that  is the desired result.

De Boor's algorithm is more efficient than an explicit calculation of B-splines  with the Cox-de Boor recursion formula, because it does not compute terms which are guaranteed to be multiplied by zero.

Optimizations 

The algorithm above is not optimized for the implementation in a computer. It requires memory for  temporary control points . Each temporary control point is written exactly once and read twice. Similarly, there is only one value of  used in each step, so we can reuse the memory as well.

Furthermore, it is more convenient to use a zero-based index  for the temporary control points. Thus we obtain the improved algorithm:

Iterate for :

 ( must be counted down)

Example implementation 

The following code in the Python programming language is a naive implementation of the optimized algorithm.

def deBoor(k: int, x: int, t, c, p: int):
    """Evaluates S(x).

    Arguments
    ---------
    k: Index of knot interval that contains x.
    x: Position.
    t: Array of knot positions, needs to be padded as described above.
    c: Array of control points.
    p: Degree of B-spline.
    """
    d = [c[j + k - p] for j in range(0, p + 1)] # this wrong, can easily give -ve indices, eg if j=0, k=0, p= eg 3, then trying to find the quantity c[-3]

    for r in range(1, p + 1):
        for j in range(p, r - 1, -1):
            alpha = (x - t[j + k - p]) / (t[j + 1 + k - r] - t[j + k - p]) # this wrong, can easily give -ve indices, eg if j=r=1, k=0, p= eg 3, then trying to find the quantity t[-2]
            d[j] = (1.0 - alpha) * d[j - 1] + alpha * d[j]

    return d[p]

See also 
De Casteljau's algorithm
Bézier curve
NURBS

External links 
 De Boor's Algorithm
The DeBoor-Cox Calculation

Computer code 
 PPPACK: contains many spline algorithms in Fortran
 GNU Scientific Library: C-library, contains a sub-library for splines ported from PPPACK
 SciPy: Python-library, contains a sub-library scipy.interpolate with spline functions based on FITPACK
 TinySpline: C-library for splines with a C++ wrapper and bindings for C#, Java, Lua, PHP, Python, and Ruby
 Einspline: C-library for splines in 1, 2, and 3 dimensions with Fortran wrappers

References 

Works cited

Numerical analysis
Splines (mathematics)
Interpolation